The Garudadri Express is an Express train belonging to South Central Railway zone that runs between  and  in India. But the rakes was maintained by South Western Railway. It is currently being operated with 16203/16204 train numbers on a daily basis.

Service

The 16203/Garudadri Express has an average speed of 41 km/hr and covers 147 km in 3h 35m. The 16204/Garudadri Express has an average speed of 37 km/hr and covers 147 km in 4h.

Route and halts 

The important halts of the train are:

 
 
 
 
 Tiruttani
 Nagari
 Ekambarakuppam
 Puttur

Coach composition

The train has standard ICF rakes with a max speed of 110 kmph. The train consists of 18 coaches:

 1 AC First Class 
 1 AC Two Tier
 2 AC Three Tier
 8 Sleeper coaches
 4 General Unreserved
 2 Seating cum Luggage Rake

Traction

Both trains are hauled by an Arakkonam Loco Shed-based WAP - 4  electric locomotive from Chennai to Renigunta then to Tirupati and vice versa.

Direction reversal

The train reverses its direction 1 times:

Rake sharing

The train shares its rake with 16219/16220- Chamarajanagar–Tirupati Express and 56209/56210 Chamarajanagar–Mysuru Passenger.

See also 

 Tirupati railway station
 Chennai Central railway station
 Sapthagiri Express
 Chamarajanagar–Mysuru Passenger
 Chamarajanagar–Tirupati Express

Notes

References

External links 

 16203/Garudadri Express India Rail Info
 16204/Garudadri Express India Rail Info

Transport in Chennai
Transport in Tirupati
Named passenger trains of India
Rail transport in Andhra Pradesh
Rail transport in Tamil Nadu
Express trains in India